This is a list of freshwater fish living wild in the US state of Maryland.

Bowfin (Amiidae) 
 Bowfin (Amia calva)

Catfishes (Ictaluridae) 
 White catfish (Ameiurus catus)
 Yellow bullhead (Ameiurus natalis)
 Brown bullhead (Ameiurus nebulosus)
 Blue catfish (Ictalurus furcatus)
 Channel catfish (Ictalurus punctatus)
 Stonecat (Noturus flavus)
 Tadpole madtom (Noturus gyrinus)
 Margined madtom (Noturus insignis)
 Flathead catfish (Pylodictis olivaris)

Eels (Anguillidae) 
 American eel (Anguilla rostrata)

Gars (Lepisosteidae) 
 Longnose gar (Lepisosteus osseus)

Herrings (Clupeidae) 
 Blueback herring (Alosa aestivalis)
 Hickory shad (Alosa mediocris)
 Alewife (Alosa pseudoharengus)
 American shad (Alosa sapidissima)
 Gizzard shad (Dorosoma cepedianum)
 Threadfin shad (Dorosoma petenense)

Killifishes (Fundulidae) 
 Banded killifish (Fundulus diaphanus)
 Mummichog (Fundulus heteroclitus)
 Spotfin killifish (Fundulus luciae)
 Striped killifish (Fundulus majalis)
 Rainwater killifish (Lucania parva)

Pupfish (Cyprinodontidae) 
 Marsh pupfish (Cyprinodon variegatus)

Lampreys (Petromyzontidae) 
 Least brook lamprey (Lampetra aepyptera)
 American brook lamprey (Lampetra appendix)
 Sea lamprey (Petromyzon marinus)

Lotids (Lotidae) 
 Burbot (Lota lota)

Minnows (Cyprinidae) 
 Central stoneroller (Campostoma anomalum)
 Goldfish (Carassius auratus)
 Redside dace (Clinostomus elongatus)
 Rosyside dace (Clinostomus funduloides)
 Grass carp (Ctenopharyngodon idella)
 Satinfin shiner (Cyprinella analostana)
 Spotfin shiner (Cyprinella spiloptera)
 Common carp (Cyprinus carpio)
 Cutlips minnow (Exoglossum maxillingua)
 Eastern silvery minnow (Hybognathus regius)
 Striped shiner (Luxilus chrysocephalus)
 Common shiner (Luxilus cornutus)
 Allegheny pearl dace (Margariscus margarita)
 River chub (Nocomis micropogon)
 Golden shiner (Notemigonus crysoleucas)
 Comely shiner (Notropis amoenus)
 Emerald shiner (Notropis atherinoides)
 Bridle shiner (Notropis bifrenatus)
 Silverjaw minnow (Notropis buccatus)
 Ironcolor shiner (Notropis chalybaeus)
 Spottail shiner (Notropis hudsonius)
 Swallowtail shiner (Notropis procne)
 Rosyface shiner (Notropis rubellus)
 Cheat minnow (Pararhinichthys bowersi)
 Bluntnose minnow (Pimephales notatus)
 Fathead minnow (Pimephales promelas)
 Eastern blacknose dace (Rhinichthys atratulus)
 Longnose dace (Rhinichthys cataractae)
 Common rudd (Scardinius erythropthalmus)
 Creek chub (Semotilus atromaculatus)
 Fallfish (Semotilus corporalis)
 Tench (Tinca tinca)

Mudminnows (Umbridae) 
 Eastern mudminnow (Umbra pygmaea)

Perches (Percidae) 
 Greenside darter (Etheostoma blennioides)
 Rainbow darter (Etheostoma caeruleum)
 Fantail darter (Etheostoma flabellare)
 Swamp darter (Etheostoma fusiforme)
 Johnny darter (Etheostoma nigrum)
 Tessellated darter (Etheostoma olmstedi)
 Maryland darter (Etheostoma sellare)
 Glassy darter (Etheostoma vitreum)
 Banded darter (Etheostoma zonale)
 Yellow perch (Perca flavescens)
 Logperch (Percina caprodes)
 Stripeback darter (Percina notogramma)
 Shield darter (Percina peltata)
 Walleye (Sander vitreum)

Percopsids (Percopsidae) 
 Trout-perch (Percopsis omiscomaycus)

Pikes (Esocidae) 
 Redfin pickerel (Esox americanus)
 Northern pike (Esox lucius)
 Muskellunge (Esox masquinongy)
Tiger muskellunge (Esox masquinongy X Esox lucius)
 Chain pickerel (Esox niger)

Pirate perch (Aphredoderidae) 
 Pirate perch (Aphredoderus sayanus)

Poeciliids (Poeciliidae) 
 Eastern mosquitofish (Gambusia holbrooki)

Pupfish (Cyprinodontidae) 
 Sheepshead minnow (Cyprinodon variegatus)

Sculpins (Cottidae) 
 Mottled sculpin (Cottus bairdii)
 Blue Ridge sculpin (Cottus caeruleomentum)

Silversides (Atherinopsidae) 
 Rough silverside (Membras martinica)
 Inland silverside (Menidia beryllina)
 Atlantic silverside (Menidia menidia)

Smelts (Osmeridae) 
 Rainbow smelt (Osmerus mordax)

Snakeheads (Channidae) 
 Northern snakehead

Sticklebacks (Gasterosteidae) 
 Fourspine stickleback (Apeltes quadracus)
 Brook stickleback (Culaea inconstans)
 Threespine stickleback (Gasterosteus aculeatus)

Sturgeons (Acipenseridae) 
 Shortnose sturgeon (Acipenser brevirostrum)
 Atlantic sturgeon (Acipenser oxyrhinchus)

Suckers (Catostomidae) 
 Quillback (Carpiodes cyprinus)
 Longnose sucker (Catostomus catostomus)
 White sucker (Catostomus commersoni)
 Creek chubsucker (Erimyzon oblongus)
 Northern hogsucker (Hypentelium nigricans)
 Golden redhorse (Moxostoma erythrurum)
 Shorthead redhorse (Moxostoma macrolepidotum)

Sunfishes (Centrarchidae) 
 Mud sunfish (Acantharcus pomotis)
 Rock bass (Amblopites rupestris)
 Flier (Centrarchus macropterus)
 Blackbanded sunfish (Enneacanthus chaetodon)
 Bluespotted sunfish (Enneacanthus gloriosus)
 Banded sunfish (Enneacanthus obesus)
 Redbreast sunfish (Lepomis auritus)
 Green sunfish (Lepomis cyanellus)
 Pumpkinseed (Lepomis gibbosus)
 Pumpkingill (Lepomis gibbosus x macrochirus)
 Warmouth (Lepomis gulosus)
 Bluegill (Lepomis macrochirus)
Greengill sunfish (Lepomis macrochirus x cyanellus)
 Longear sunfish (Lepomis megalotis)
 Redear sunfish (Lepomis microlophus)
 Smallmouth bass (Micropterus dolomieu)
 Largemouth bass (Micropterus salmoides)
 White crappie (Pomoxis annularis)
 Black crappie (Pomoxis nigromaculatus)

Temperate basses (Moronidae) 
 White perch (Morone americana)
 Striped bass (Morone saxatilis)

Trout and whitefish (Salmonidae) 
 Cutthroat trout (Oncorhynchus clarki)
 Rainbow trout (Oncorhynchus mykiss)
 Brown trout (Salmo trutta)
 Brook trout (Salvelinus fontinalis)
 Lake trout (Salvelinus namaycush)
 Lake herring (Coregonus artedii)

References
 Dnr.state.md: Fish key of native species

Freshwater fish
Maryland
.Maryland
.Maryland